The Office of Archaeology and Historic Preservation (OAHP) may be:

 Colorado Office of Archaeology and Historic Preservation
 Washington State Department of Archaeology and Historic Preservation